The Taronga Zoo ferry service is a ferry route in Sydney, New South Wales, Australia. It connects Taronga Zoo with the transport hub at Circular Quay. The route forms part of the Sydney Ferries network. In 2013, the Taronga Zoo ferry service was given the designation of F2 as part of a program to number all Sydney Ferries, Sydney Trains and light rail lines. Some F2 Taronga Zoo services are combined with F6 Mosman services, extending to Mosman Bay.

History

The first service to Taronga Zoo commenced on 24 September 1916 with a vehicular ferry taking the elephant 'Jessi' across the harbour to her new home from the old zoo at Moore Park.

Services

Wharves
[
{
  "type": "ExternalData",
  "service": "page",
  "title": "Circular Quay ferry wharf.map"
},
{
  "type": "ExternalData",
  "service": "page",
  "title": "Taronga Zoo ferry wharf.map"
}
]

Circular Quay

Circular Quay is a major Sydney transport hub, with a large ferry, rail and bus interchange. F2 Taronga Zoo services usually depart from Wharf 2. The wharves are wheelchair-accessible.

Taronga Zoo

The Taronga Zoo ferry wharf is, for many tourists, the preferred mode of entry to Sydney's major zoological park. Passengers disembarking at the wharf, located on Bradleys Head Road, can enter the zoo via a cable car or connect with local bus services. The wharf is wheelchair-accessible.

Patronage

The following table shows the patronage of Sydney Ferries network for the year ending 30 June 2022.

References

External links
F2 Taronga Zoo at Transport for New South Wales

Ferry transport in Sydney